John Jeremiah Lawler (August 4, 1862 – March 11, 1948) was an American prelate of the Roman Catholic Church. He served as bishop of the Diocese of Lead (later changed to Diocese of Rapid City) in South Dakota from 1916 until his death in 1948.  He previously served as an auxiliary bishop of the Archdiocese of Saint Paul in Minnesota from 1910 to 1916.

Biography

Early life 
John Lawler was born on August 4, 1862, in Rochester, Minnesota, and attended St. Francis Seminary in Milwaukee, Wisconsin. He continued his studies in Belgium, studying philosophy at the College of St. Nicholas in Flanders and theology at the University of Louvain.

Priesthood 
Lawler was ordained to the priesthood at Louvain on December 19, 1885. Following his return to Minnesota, Lawler served as professor of Scripture at the College of St. Thomas and later pastor of St. Luke's Parish in St. Paul. He also served as rector of the Cathedral of St. Paul. As rector, he was instrumental in the erection of the cathedral at a cost of $5 million.

Auxiliary Bishop of Saint Paul 
On February 8, 1910, Lawler was appointed auxiliary bishop of the Archdiocese of St. Paul and titular bishop of Hermopolis Maior by Pope Pius X. He received his episcopal consecration on the following May 19 from Archbishop John Ireland, with Bishops James McGolrick and James Trobec serving as co-consecrators. As an auxiliary bishop, he assisted Archbishop Ireland for six years.

Bishop of Lead/Rapid City 
Lawler was appointed the third Bishop of Lead by Pope Benedict XV on January 29, 1916. On August 1, 1930, the episcopal see of the diocese was changed from Lead to Rapid City, and the name of the diocese was changed accordingly. In 1947, Lawler, who had been in failing health, received Bishop William McCarty as his coadjutor bishop.

Death and legacy 
John Lawler died following a stroke on March 11, 1948, at age 85. At the time of his death, he was the oldest Catholic bishop in the United States and, after Bishop Alexander Joseph McGavick, was the second most senior in years of service.

References

1862 births
1948 deaths
University of St. Thomas (Minnesota) faculty
St. Francis Seminary (Wisconsin) alumni
People from Rochester, Minnesota
20th-century Roman Catholic bishops in the United States
Roman Catholic bishops of Lead
Roman Catholic bishops of Rapid City
Roman Catholic Archdiocese of Saint Paul and Minneapolis
Religious leaders from Minnesota
Catholics from Minnesota
Catholics from South Dakota